The women's road race of the 2004 UCI Road World Championships cycling event took place on 2 October in Verona, Italy. Starting at 13:30 CEST, the race was 132.75 km long, which constituted of 9 laps of a circuit around Torricelle, including the 3.4 km Torricelle climb, with an average gradient of approximately 4%, 7% at the steepest point. The course was almost identical to the one used for the 1999 UCI Road World Championships when Edita Pučinskaitė won the women's championship.

The race was won by the German rider Judith Arndt.

Final classification

References 

Women's Road Race
UCI Road World Championships – Women's road race
2004 in women's road cycling